

Buildings and structures

Buildings
 c. 2580 BC the Pyramid of Khufu, the oldest and largest of the three great pyramids in the Giza Necropolis, is completed
 c. 2532 BC the Pyramid of Khafre, in the Giza Necropolis, is completed
 the Pyramid of Menkaure, in the Giza Necropolis, is completed
 the Great Sphinx of Giza is completed

See also
Timeline of architecture

References 

Architecture